Anugrah Bohrey is a Canada-based Indian Film-maker. He started his film career with White Hill Production Inc., as a screenwriter for Best of Luck (2013). He is currently involved with the production of a sport based film, Himmat Singh. He is an alumnus of Vancouver Film School and London Film School.

Career
Anugrah Bohrey worked as an assistant director on Jatt and Juliet before his writing assignment with White Hill Production Inc. in 2011. He also worked as an assistant director in Jatt and Juliet 2. Apart from Best of Luck (2013) and Himmat Singh, Anugrah Bohrey is scripting a Bollywood project.

Personal life
He lives in Vancouver, where he has worked in the BC film industry, as a writer, associate director, cinematographer and associate producer.

Select filmography

References

External links

 

Indian male screenwriters
Living people
Vancouver Film School alumni
Indian male dramatists and playwrights
Screenwriters from Delhi
Year of birth missing (living people)